Stichodactyla gigantea, commonly known as the giant carpet anemone, is a species of sea anemone that lives in the Indo-Pacific area.  It can be kept in an aquarium but is a very challenging species to keep alive and healthy for more than 3–5 years.

Description
It can appear in a number of colors, commonly brown or greenish and rarely a striking purple or pink, deep blue, or bright green. A healthy S. gigantea will possess tentacles that are extremely sticky to the touch, with firm adherence to surfaces.

Ecology
Most anemones are treated as sessile, but the ones inhabited by anemonefish are in fact motile. Zooxanthellae are obligate symbionts within the anemone.

S. gigantea hosts 7 different species of anemonefish 
Amphiprion akindynos (Barrier reef anemonefish)
A. bicinctus (Two-band anemonefish)
A. clarkii (Clark's anemonefish)
A. ocellaris (False clownfish)
A. percula (Clownfish)
A. perideraion (Pink skunk anemonefish)
A. rubrocinctus (Australian anemonefish)

Juvenile Dascyllus trimaculatus also associate with S. gigantea.

Aquarium trade
S. gigantea is uncommon in the aquarium trade. Though smaller in size than other carpet anemone species, it is significantly more delicate, and requires a large, mature reef aquarium. Like all sea anemones in captivity that have a symbiotic, mutualistic relationship with anemonefish, S. gigantea requires intense aquarium lighting, impeccable water quality, and stable parameters. It is prone to shipping stress and bacterial infections during transit. Due to these factors, many hobbyists advocate quarantining this anemone and treating with antibiotics such as Ciprofloxacin or Septra for a minimum of one week before acclimating it to the main tank.

References

External links

 
 
 Hexacorallians of the World

Stichodactylidae
Animals described in 1775
Taxa named by Peter Forsskål